Costacosa is a genus of spiders in the family Lycosidae. It was first described in 2013 by Framenau & Leung. , it contains 2 species, both from western Australia.

References

Lycosidae
Araneomorphae genera
Spiders of Australia